The Sportküstenschifferschein (SKS) (sport-coastal ship-licence) is one of the official leisure craft licences in Germany. Training and testing is tailored to the driving of motor yachts and sailing yachts in coastal waters (all seas to 12 nautical miles' distance from the mainland coast).

The SKS-proof driver's license equivalent to the English ability RYA/MCA Yachtmaster Coastal Certificate of Competence.

International Certificate of Competence 

The SKS includes the International Certificate of Competence in accordance with Resolution No. 40 of the Economic Commission of the United Nations International Certificate of Competence. It therefore can be used to certify a skipper's competence abroad.

Also check 
 List of certificates for operators of pleasure craft
 International Certificate of Competence

Sailing qualifications
Water transport in Germany